Marstonia olivacea, common name the olive marstonia, was a species of very small freshwater snail, an aquatic gastropod mollusk in the family Hydrobiidae. This species was endemic to Alabama, the United States. Its natural habitat was rivers. This species is now extinct.

References

Hydrobiidae
Extinct gastropods
Gastropods described in 1895
Taxonomy articles created by Polbot